New Taipei City electoral constituencies consist of 12 single-member constituencies, each represented by a member of the Republic of China Legislative Yuan.

Current constituencies

New Taipei City Constituency I: Shimen, Sanzhi, Tamsui, Bali, Linkou, Taishan
New Taipei City Constituency II: Wugu, Luzhou, Sanchong (16 villages)
New Taipei City Constituency III: Sanchong (103 villages)
New Taipei City Constituency IV: Xinzhuang (75 villages)
New Taipei City Constituency V: Shulin, Yingge, Xinzhuang (9 villages)
New Taipei City Constituency VI: West Banqiao (65 villages)
New Taipei City Constituency VII: East Banqiao (61 villages)
New Taipei City Constituency VIII: Zhonghe (76 villages)
New Taipei City Constituency IX: Yonghe, Zhonghe (17 villages)
New Taipei City Constituency X: Tucheng, Sanxia
New Taipei City Constituency XI: Xindian, Shenkeng, Shiding, Pinglin, Wulai
New Taipei City Constituency XII: Xizhi, Jinshan, Wanli, Ruifang, Pingxi, Shuangxi, Gongliao

Legislators

Gao Jyh-peng resigned in 2018 due to a corruption sentence.

Election results

2016

2019 By-election

References

Constituencies in Taiwan